is a Japanese voice actress affiliated with Pro-Fit. Some of her major roles are Mei Misaki in Another, Miku Maekawa in The Idolmaster Cinderella Girls, Nikka Edvardine Katajainen in Brave Witches, Ellery Himeyuri in Tantei Opera Milky Holmes, Konatsu Toro  in Gokujyo, Hiotan in Denkigai no Honya-san,  and Misaki Kamiigusa in  The Pet Girl of Sakurasou.

Filmography

Anime

Film

Video games

Drama CD

References

External links
 

1987 births
Living people
Actors from Yamanashi Prefecture
Japanese video game actresses
Japanese voice actresses
Musicians from Yamanashi Prefecture
Voice actresses from Yamanashi Prefecture